Imperial Valley Mall is an enclosed shopping mall in El Centro, California. Opened in 2005, the mall features J. C. Penney, Dillard's, and Macy's as its anchor stores. It is managed by CBL & Associates Properties.

History
Sears and J. C. Penney were confirmed as mall tenants in 2002. The mall was approved for construction in 2003. Among the first tenants confirmed were Dairy Queen, Foot Locker, Kay Jewelers, Pac Sun, Payless ShoeSource, and a 14-screen UltraStar Cinemas, now a Cinemark.

It opened for business on March 9, 2005, with J. C. Penney, Sears, Dillard's, and Robinsons-May (now Macy's) as its four anchor stores. Sears relocated from El Centro Mall, an older mall in town. A day before the mall's opening, the owners held a "preview party" in which customers could purchase tickets to view the mall before it officially opened for business.

In 2015, Sears Holdings spun off 235 of its properties, including the Sears at Imperial Valley Mall, into Seritage Growth Properties.

On October 15, 2018, it was announced that Sears would be closing as part of a plan to close 142 stores nationwide. The store closed in January 2019.

References

External links
 

El Centro, California
Shopping malls in California
Shopping malls established in 2005
CBL Properties